Rivier can mean:
 Wadi, dry riverbed, called rivier in southwest Africa
 Rivier University, American liberal arts college

Surname
 Anne-Marie Rivier (1768–1838), French nun
 Hélène Rivier (1902–1986), Swiss librarian
 Jean Rivier (1896–1987), French composer
 Silvio Rivier, Croatian–Australian television presenter
 William Rivier, 20th-century Swiss chess master

See also
 River (disambiguation)
 Rivière (disambiguation)